Lyduokiai is a town in Ukmergė district municipality, Vilnius County, east Lithuania. According to the Lithuanian census of 2011, the town has a population of 142 people. The town has a church of Catholics.

Its alternate names include Liduokyay, Lyduokių, Lyduokliai, Liduokyay, Lyduokių, and Nidoki (Polish).

References

Towns in Vilnius County
Towns in Lithuania